Chris Kowalczuk (born January 17, 1985) is a Canadian football guard who last played for the Winnipeg Blue Bombers of the Canadian Football League. He was signed as an undrafted free agent by the Winnipeg Blue Bombers on April 22, 2010. He played CIS Football with the Toronto Varsity Blues.

References

External links
Just Sports Stats
Winnipeg Blue Bombers bio

1985 births
Canadian football offensive linemen
Living people
Players of Canadian football from Ontario
Sportspeople from Brampton
Toronto Varsity Blues football players
Winnipeg Blue Bombers players